Västernorrland County Museum (Swedish: Västernorrlands Museum a.k.a. Länsmuseet Västernorrland) is the regional museum of Västernorrland County, Sweden. The museum's head office is currently located at Härnösand in Härnösand Municipality. Among the museum's many activities, the extensive exhibition activities are one of the most important. Other very important activities concern the preservation of old buildings and the care of the county's cultural heritage environments and archaeological sites, a work that is carried out in collaboration with the County Administrative Board of Västernorrland (Swedish: Länsstyrelsen Västernorrland). The museum serves all inhabitants in the county. It documents both prehistorical and historical structures in the county and promotes the visiting of them. The current museum director is Jenny Samuelsson and the current chairman is Carl L. Thunberg.
Among the areas covered by the museum is the UNESCO World Heritage Site of the High Coast area (Swedish: Höga Kusten).

History 
The history of the museum began in 1880 when Bishop Lars Landgren took the first initiative on founding a museum. On 27 February that year the Vesternorrlands läns museisällskap (English: Vesternorrland county museum society) was formed. The first collection consisted of 66 exotic objects from the South Seas and South America, donated by captain Daniel Norlin. After Bishop Landgren's death in 1888, the museum society led a waning existence for two decades. In 1909 Theodor Hellman initiated Föreningen för norrländsk hembygdsforskning (English: The Association for Northern Homeland Research). Hellman's vision was to create a northern farming community in miniature and a center for research and teaching about culture, history and nature in northern Sweden. The great role model at the time was Skansen in Stockholm, created by Artur Hazelius.

Museum directors 
 1909–1946: Theodor Hellman
 1947–1976: Bo Hellman
 1977–2000: Tommy Puktörne
 2001–2012: Bengt Edgren
 2012–2015: Lillian Rathje
 2015: Robert Olsson
 2016 – : Jenny Samuelsson

Chairmen 
 1978–1979: Helge Sundin
 1980–1991: Rut Sandström
 1992–2006: Kerstin Nygren
 2007-2010: Kenneth Westin
 2011-2014: Sverker Ågren
 2015–2018: Brita Wessinger
 2019–2022: Thomas Näsholm
 2023 – : Carl L. Thunberg

References

External links 

Västernorrland County Museum Website
Västernorrland County Museum on the website of Swedish County Museums 
Västernorrland County Museum on the website of Härnösand Municipality

See also 
Stockholm County Museum

History museums in Sweden
 
Counties of Sweden
Types of administrative division